The culture of Burundi is based on local tradition and common influence with its neighbors.

Music 

Traditional drumming of karyenda is an important part of Burundian cultural heritage, as indicated by the world-famous Royal Drummers of Burundi.  Traditional dance often accompanies the drumming, which is frequently seen in celebrations and family gatherings.  Some Burundian artisans have special songs to accompany different stages of their work.

Media

Literature and oral tradition 

During the 1972 genocide, many Burundians involved in higher education were killed, stalling written culture.  This combined with the lower literacy rate have encouraged an adherence to Burundi's strong oral tradition, which relays history and life lessons through storytelling, poetry, and song.  This is evident in kivivuga amazina, an improvisational poetry contest played by cattle herders, in which they boast their abilities or accomplishments.

Sports 

Football is a popular pastime throughout the country, as are mancala games.  Many Burundians celebrate Christian holidays and Burundian Independence Day, though the largest celebration occurs on New Year's Day with feasting and traditional drumming and dancing.

Burundi's women's national volleyball team lastly qualified for the 2021 Women's African Nations Volleyball Championship.

Cuisine 

Burundian cuisine utilises maize and bananas as staple foods and often contains red kidney beans. Meals are not usually accompanied by sweet foods or dessert.  During celebrations and gatherings, Burundians drink homemade banana wine and beer, sometimes drinking through straws from a single large container.

In some areas, brochettes and frites are a popular remnant of the Belgian colonial period. The presence of Lake Tanganyika Lake Tanganyika adds fish such as ngangara and mukeke to Burundian cuisine. A national brewery produces Primus and Amstel beers.

Education and environment 

Burundi has the University of Burundi. There are several museums in the cities, such as the Burundi Geological Museum in Bujumbura and the Burundi National Museum and the Burundi Museum of Life in Gitega. Adult literacy is at about half among men and about a quarter among women.

There are several wildlife and nature preserves, and the southern town of Rutana contains a monument to the source of the Nile River.

See also 

 List of African cuisines

References

External links 
 Canadian Cultural Profiles Project, Burundi
 Travel Agency cultural information
 Lonely Planet: Burundi
 Small article on Burundi culture

Burundian culture